Southern Hockey League can refer to two different professional ice hockey leagues:

Southern Hockey League (1973–1977)
Southern Hockey League (1995–96)

de:Southern Hockey League